George Raymond Bird (June 23, 1850 – November 9, 1940) was a Major League Baseball center fielder in the 19th century.  He played for the Rockford Forest Citys of the National Association in 1871.  He was a native of Stillman Valley, Illinois.
  
In 25 games as the Forest Citys starting center fielder, Bird batted .264 (28-for-106) with two doubles, five triples, 13 RBI, and 19 runs scored.

External links
Baseball Reference

1850 births
1940 deaths
19th-century baseball players
Baseball players from Illinois
Major League Baseball center fielders
People from Stillman Valley, Illinois
Rockford Forest Citys players